Francisco Javier González Pérez (born 14 July 1969), known as Fran, is a Spanish retired professional footballer.

He spent his entire career with Deportivo, as a left midfielder with skill and field vision, helping the club win the first La Liga title in its history.

Fran represented Spain at Euro 2000.

Club career
Fran, one of the most notable players in Deportivo de La Coruña's history, was born in Carreira, Santa Uxía de Ribeira, Galicia, and was promoted to the first team in 1988, making his La Liga debut on 31 August 1991 in a 2–1 away loss against Valencia CF. Quickly established, he only missed eight league games in his first five seasons – also scoring on 24 occasions – while already being captain.

In the 1995–96 off-season, Real Madrid almost signed Fran (previously, in early 1992 and unbeknownst to him, he had agreed to a pre-contract with that club after having already put pen to paper to a new deal at Deportivo), but he regretted leaving and returned quickly. In 1999–2000, as Depor conquered its first national championship, injuries limited him to only 22 matches, and he added a goal in a 2–0 home win over Valencia on 12 March 2000.

Fran retired from football at the end of the 2004–05 campaign after 17 years at the Estadio Riazor, 14 in the first division, at the same time as Mauro Silva, with both playing their last game on 22 May 2005 in a 3–0 home defeat to RCD Mallorca. He made 700 competitive appearances.

In 2008, Fran returned to Deportivo, joining its indoor soccer team alongside former teammates Djalminha, Donato, Noureddine Naybet and Jacques Songo'o.

International career
Fran made his Spain national team debut on 27 January 1993, in a friendly 1–1 draw against Mexico in Las Palmas. In total he earned 16 caps, participating at UEFA Euro 2000 where he played his last international, a 4–3 group stage victory over Yugoslavia.

In April 2016, Fran was appointed Galicia's manager alongside Míchel Salgado.

International goals
Scores and results list Spain's goal tally first, score column indicates score after each Fran goal.

Personal life
Fran's older brother, José Ramón, was also a footballer (and a midfielder). He too spent several seasons with Deportivo, but with much less individual impact. 

His son Nicolás was also involved in the sport, most notably with FC Barcelona.

Honours
La Liga: 1999–2000
Copa del Rey: 1994–95, 2001–02
Supercopa de España: 1995, 2000, 2002

See also
List of La Liga players (400+ appearances)
List of one-club men in association football

References

External links

Deportivo archives

1969 births
Living people
People from O Barbanza
Sportspeople from the Province of A Coruña
Spanish footballers
Footballers from Galicia (Spain)
Association football midfielders
La Liga players
Segunda División players
Tercera División players
Deportivo Fabril players
Deportivo de La Coruña players
Spain international footballers
UEFA Euro 2000 players
Spanish football managers